Robert Lloyd Peden (born 11 November 1973) is an Australian former professional boxer who won the vacant IBF super featherweight title in 2005 by beating Nate Campbell by TKO. Peden was the third person of Aboriginal descent to win a world title, joining super middleweight Anthony Mundine (2003) and bantamweight Lionel Rose (1968).

Background
Peden is the son of an Aboriginal mother.  His father was of Scottish heritage.

Amateur career
His amateur record was 130–15. He was a five-time national amateur champion, won the 1994 Commonwealth Games and won the 1995 and 1996 Liverpool Cup. He represented Australia at the 1992 and 1996 Olympic Games.

He was a member of the 1992 Australian Olympic team as a flyweight. His results were:
Defeated Marty O'Donnell (Canada) 14–2
Defeated Yacin Chikh (Algeria) KO 2
Lost to Chol-Su Choi (North Korea) 11–25

He was a member of the 1996 Australian Olympic team as a featherweight. His results were:
Defeated Mohammed Achik (Morocco) 15–7
Lost to Serafim Todorov (Bulgaria) 8–20

Professional career
Known as "Bomber", Peden turned pro in 1996 and captured the vacant IBF super featherweight title in 2005 with a TKO over Nate Campbell. After the win against Campbell, he took on Marco Antonio Barrera in an attempt to unify the belts and lost his title seven months after winning it. He was inducted into the Australian National Boxing Hall of Fame in 2012.

Personal life
Peden is still involved in boxing, running the Fitzroys Stars Gym in Melbourne, which is housed inside an Aboriginal community center. Peden, who is of Aboriginal descent, is heavily involved in that community, serving as CEO of the Indigenous Solutions Aboriginal Corporation, while also working with Melbourne Aboriginal Youth Sport and Recreation and the Victorian Aboriginal Child Care Association.

References

External links
 
 
 

1973 births
Living people
Australian male boxers
Olympic boxers of Australia
Boxers at the 1992 Summer Olympics
Boxers at the 1996 Summer Olympics
Commonwealth Games gold medallists for Australia
Commonwealth Games medallists in boxing
Boxers at the 1994 Commonwealth Games
International Boxing Federation champions
Boxers trained by Kevin Barry
Indigenous Australian Olympians
Indigenous Australian boxers
Boxers from Brisbane
Bantamweight boxers
Medallists at the 1994 Commonwealth Games